Mervyn Sharp is a long distance swimmer from Weymouth, Dorset. His first crossing of the English channel was in 1967 from France-England, he did it in eight hours and thirty four minutes. He then swam the channel from England-France in 1968, 1969, 1970, 1973 and 1974. He held the 'King of the channel' title from 1974-1975, it was then broken by Des Renford. He was a member of Weymouth swimming club in Weymouth.

References

English male swimmers
English Channel swimmers
Sportspeople from Weymouth
Living people
Year of birth missing (living people)